Floods in Malaysia are one of the most regular natural disasters affecting the country, which occurs nearly every year especially during the monsoon season. The coasts of peninsular Malaysia are the most prone to flooding especially during the northeast monsoon season from October to March.

Notable floods
 10 December 1969 – Kluang flood.
 January 1971 – Kuala Lumpur hit by flash floods.
 2 March 2006 – Shah Alam hit by flash floods.
 19 December 2006 – Several parts of Johor state including Muar, Johor Bahru, Skudai and Segamat were hit by flash floods.
 10 January 2007 – Several parts of Johor were hit by flash floods again.
 10 June 2007 – Kuala Lumpur hit by flash floods, worst since 10 June 2003.
 December 2007 – Several parts of East Coast of Peninsula including Kelantan, Terengganu, Pahang and Johor were hit by flash floods.
 November 2010 – Kedah and Perlis flooded due to heavy rainfall after a tropical depression.
 December 2014 – Northern and Eastern states of Kelantan, Terengganu, Pahang, Perak and Perlis in Malay Peninsula were hit by flash floods including some areas in Sabah.
 4 & 5 November 2017 – Northern state of Penang in Malay Peninsula were hit by flash floods caused unusually heavy rains in Tropical Depression 29W, Typhoon Damrey. Flood waters in parts of the city reached 3.7 m (12 ft), submerging entire homes.
 2020–2021 Malaysian floods – In late 2020 and early 2021, Terengganu, Pahang and Johor were more particularly affected by flash floods. 
 2021–2022 Malaysian floods – In late 2021 and early 2022, Klang Valley (Port Klang, Klang, Setia Alam, Puncak Alam, Kota Kemuning, Shah Alam, Kuala Lumpur, Ampang, Cheras, Hulu Langat, Puchong, Dengkil) hit by a worst flash floods ever seen in 50 years due to Tropical Depression 29W. Other reports include Lubok Cina, Kuantan, Bentong, Gua Musang, Kuala Linggi, Seremban and Teluk Intan experienced the flash flood as well.

Causes
 Given Malaysia's geographical location, most floods that occur are a natural result of cyclical monsoons during the local tropical wet season that are characterised by heavy and regular rainfall from roughly October to March.
 Inadequate drainage in many urban areas also enhance the effects of heavy rain, though efforts are underway to resolve this.
 Climate change in Malaysia is expected to impact flooding in the country, with the frequency of extreme weather increasing.

List of flash floods areas in Malaysia

Klang Valley and Selangor
 Along Klang River in Klang Valley
 Kuala Lumpur city centre near Masjid Jamek
 Dang Wangi, Kuala Lumpur
 Along Gombak River in Klang Valley
 Along Kerayong River in Kuala Lumpur
 Sungai Besi near Razak Mansion
 Along Damansara River in Shah Alam
 From Taman TTDI Jaya, Giant Hypermarket, Shah Alam Stadium until Batu Tiga.

Perak
 Along Kuala Kangsar highway

Penang
 Seberang Jaya Interchange underpass on Butterworth-Kulim Expressway near Aeon Big Seberang Jaya

Kedah
 Along Muda River
 Kepala Batas near Sultan Abdul Halim Airport, Alor Star

Perlis

Kelantan
 Along Kelantan River in Kelantan
 Tambatan Diraja, Kuala Krai
 Tangga Krai, Kuala Krai
 Golok River, Tumpat

Terengganu
 Dungun River
 Terengganu River near Kuala Berang
 Besut River

Pahang
 Pahang River from Temerloh to Pekan town
 Kuantan River in Kuantan

Negeri Sembilan
 Gemas

Malacca
 Kesang River

Johor
 Along Sungai Air Molek in Johor Bahru
 From Johor Bahru Prison, Federal Building (Wisma Persekutuan), Tabung Haji Building, JOTIC, Dewan Jubli Intan, until Court Building near Istana Besar.
 Skudai River in Johor Bahru
 Along Tebrau River in Johor Bahru
 Kampung Kangkar Tebrau
 Johor River near Kota Tinggi
 Along Sungai Benut from Simpang Renggam to Benut
 Sungai Simpang Kiri and Sungai Simpang Kanan in Batu Pahat
 Along Semberong River in Batu Pahat
 Segamat River near Segamat
 Along Muar River from Segamat to Muar district

Sabah
 Along the Penampang Road
 Padas River
 Sandakan areas of Sim-Sim Road, BDC Road at Mile 1 (Batu Satu), Sepilok Road at Mile 14 (Batu 14) and Gum-Gum Road at Mile 16 (Batu 16)
 Tawau areas of Sin On Road, Chong Thien Vun Road, Pasadena Park, Aman Ria 5, LCN Park, Villa Park, Green Park, Eastern Plaza, Takada Commercial Square, Apas Batu  Road 1 ½, Kampung Saadani Apas Batu Road 2, Kampung Pasir Puteh, Kampung Tanjung Batu, Leeka Park, Kampung Batu Dua, Pasadena Park and Setia Park

Sarawak
 Kuching areas

References

External links
 Department of Irrigation and Drainage (DID) Malaysia
 Malaysian Meteorological Services
 Infobanjir @ DID Malaysia 
 Latest Malaysian flood info